The  is a 32/64-bit fifth-generation home video game console that was developed by Sega and released on November 22, 1994, in Japan, May 11, 1995 in North America, and July 8, 1995, in Europe as the successor to the successful Sega Genesis. The Saturn has a dual-CPU architecture and eight processors. Its games are in CD-ROM format, and its game library contains several arcade ports as well as original titles.

Development of the Saturn began in 1992, the same year Sega's groundbreaking 3D Model 1 arcade hardware debuted. Designed around a new CPU from Japanese electronics company Hitachi, another video display processor was incorporated into the system's design in early 1994 to better compete with Sony's forthcoming PlayStation. The Saturn was initially successful in Japan, but failed to sell in large numbers in the United States after its surprise May 1995 launch, four months before its scheduled release date. After the debut of the Nintendo 64 in late 1996, the Saturn rapidly lost market share in the U.S., where it was discontinued in 1998. Having sold 9.26 million units worldwide, the Saturn is considered a commercial failure. The failure of Sega's development teams to release a core game in the Sonic the Hedgehog series, known in development as Sonic X-treme, has been considered a factor in the console's poor performance.

Although the Saturn is remembered for several well-regarded games, including Nights into Dreams, the Panzer Dragoon series, and the Virtua Fighter series, its reputation is mixed due to its complex hardware design and limited third-party support. Sega's management has been criticized for its decision-making during the system's development and discontinuation.

This is an incomplete list of video games released for the Sega Saturn video game console. There are currently  games on this list not including non-game software and compilations of Saturn games. This list is organized initially in alphabetical order, but it can also be organized by developer, publisher, or year of release. There are 785 Japan-exclusive games, making 75% of the whole list. For games that were in announced or in development for the Saturn, but never released, see the list of cancelled Sega Saturn games.

Games

Non-game software and compilations

See also

List of Sega video game franchises
List of cancelled games for Sega consoles
Lists of video games

References

Sega Saturn
 
Saturn